IGF like family member 3 is a protein that in humans is encoded by the IGFL3 gene.

Function

IGFL3 belongs to the insulin-like growth factor (IGF; see MIM 147440) family of signaling molecules that play critical roles in cellular energy metabolism and in growth and development, especially prenatal growth (Emtage et al., 2006 [PubMed 16890402]).

References

Further reading 

Genes
Human proteins